Caitríona Perry (born 15 October 1980) is an Irish journalist and presenter with Raidió Teilifís Éireann (RTÉ), Ireland's national radio and television station, where she has presented the Six One News since January 2018. She has previously worked as a news correspondent since 2000 and was the RTÉ News Washington correspondent from February 2013 to December 2017.

Career
Perry attained a BA in journalism from Dublin City University, with a work placement in Dublin radio station NewsTalk 106. She attained an MA in International Relations. She joined RTÉ in 2007 after previously worked at Newstalk and Today FM. Perry made headlines around the world after an encounter with United States President Donald Trump in June 2017 at the White House when, while he was on a call with the new Taoiseach Leo Varadkar, he summoned Perry to compliment her on having a "nice smile", which Irish Central described as Trump being "fixated with" Perry, The Daily Telegraph described as "creepy", and Perry herself described as "bizarre".

She provided extensive coverage of the 2016 United States presidential election, and she subsequently wrote a book about her experience of the election entitled In America: Tales from Trump Country. The book has been highly acclaimed in Ireland, with some reviewers describing it as "spellbindingly good" and "insightful". It was shortlisted for an Irish Book Award in 2017.

In January 2018, Perry took over as co-anchor of the RTÉ News: Six One alongside Keelin Shanley.

Personal life
Perry grew up in Knocklyon in Dublin and is a graduate of Dublin City University where she completed an Undergraduate Degree in Journalism in 2002 and a master's degree in International Relations in 2010. Perry is married.

On 29 January 2019, Perry announced that she was expecting her first child. She gave birth to a baby girl on 29 July 2019. On 14 April 2022, Perry announced that she was expecting her second child. She gave birth to a baby boy on 20 September 2022.

References

Irish women radio presenters
Irish women journalists
Living people
RTÉ newsreaders and journalists
1980 births